Susanna Bordone (born 9 September 1981 in Milan, Italy) is an Italian Olympic eventing and dressage rider. She competed at three Summer Olympics (in 2004, 2008 and 2020). Her best Olympic results came in 2008 when she placed 5th in the team eventing. Her top individual Olympic result is 18th place from Tokyo 2020.

Bordone also participated at three World Equestrian Games (in 2002, 2006 and 2010), at five European Eventing Championships (in 2003, 2005, 2007, 2009 and 2011) and at two European Dressage Championships (in 2009 and 2011). She has won two team medals at the continental eventing championships.

References

Italian female equestrians
1981 births
Olympic equestrians of Italy
Equestrians at the 2004 Summer Olympics
Equestrians at the 2008 Summer Olympics
Living people
Italian dressage riders
Sportspeople from Milan
Equestrians at the 2020 Summer Olympics